The list of ship decommissionings in 1943 includes a chronological list of all ships decommissioned in 1943.


See also 

1943
 Ship decommissionings
Ship